One-Eyed Jack is an album by Garland Jeffreys, released in 1978 on A&M Records. It was recorded at Atlantic Studios, New York City, and produced by Jeffreys and David Spinozza. It was dedicated: "in Memory of my childhood idol, Jackie Robinson...here comes the One-Eyed Jack, Sometimes white and sometimes black".

The album peaked at No. 99 on the Billboard 200.

Critical reception
The Globe and Mail wrote that "the promise shown in one earlier album has either disappeared entirely or has been smothered under a battery of badly-produced backup musicians." The Rolling Stone Album Guide called One-Eyed Jack "a somewhat confused, less-than-catchy concept album."

Track listing
All tracks composed by Garland Jeffreys; except where indicated
 "She Didn't Lie" - 3:25
 "Keep On Trying" - 3:14
 "Reelin'" - 3:14
 "Haunted House" - 2:53
 "One-Eyed Jack" - 5:01
 "Scream in the Night" - 3:50
 "No Woman No Cry" (Vincent Ford, Bob Marley) - 4:42
 "Oh My Soul" - 4:03
 "Desperation Drive" - 4:21
 "Been There and Back" - 4:24

Charts

Personnel 
Garland Jeffreys - guitar, percussion, vocals
Hugh McCracken - guitar, slide guitar, harmonica
David Spinozza - guitar, slide guitar, piano
Andy Cherna, Jeff Mironov - guitar
Anthony Jackson - bass
Don Grolnick - piano, organ
Dr. John - piano, clavinet
Rob Mounsey - organ
Rick Trifan - mini Moog, synthetic strings
Winston Grennan, Rick Shlosser - drums
Steve Gadd - drums, timbales, percussion
Ralph MacDonald - congas, percussion
Michael Brecker, George Young - tenor saxophone
David Sanborn - alto and baritone saxophone
Lou Delgato - baritone saxophone
Randy Brecker, Alan Rubin, Marvin Stamm - trumpet
David Lasley, Diana Graselli, Diva Gray, Phoebe Snow, Luther Vandross - backing vocals
Technical
"Iron Mike" Michael O'Reilly - assistant engineer
Lew Hahn - recording, mixing
Carole Langer - creative director
Chuck Beeson - design
Bob Richardson - cover photography

References

1978 albums
Garland Jeffreys albums
Albums produced by David Spinozza
A&M Records albums